Owen Davies (born 1969) is a British historian who specialises in the history of magic, witchcraft, ghosts, and popular medicine. He is currently Professor in History at the University of Hertfordshire and has been described as Britain's "foremost academic expert on the history of magic".

Early life and education 
Davies's interest in the history of witchcraft and magic developed out of a childhood interest in folklore and mythology, which was spawned in part from reading the books of Alan Garner. From around the age of sixteen, he also became interested in archaeology and began to get involved with field-walking and earthwork surveying. He then went on to study archaeology and history at Cardiff University and spent many weeks over the next six years helping excavate Bronze Age and Neolithic sites in France and England, mostly in the area around Avebury. He developed a strong interest in archaeology in general, and the ritual monuments and practices of the Neolithic and Bronze Age.

From Cardiff, he went on to write a doctorate at Lancaster University. Completed in 1995, Davies's thesis looked at the continuation and decline of popular belief in witchcraft and magic from the Witchcraft Act 1735 to the Fraudulent Mediums Act 1951 (1991–1994).

Career 
Davies has authored and edited 15 books and numerous research articles.

He has been a key collaborator in a number of large-scale historical research projects. From 2010 to 2015, Davies was Co-Investigator on 'Harnessing the Power of the Criminal Corpse', a Wellcome Trust funded project exploring "the meanings, treatment, and uses of the criminal corpse". Davies was also a Co-Investigator on the major Leverhulme-funded project 'Inner Lives: Emotions, Identity, and the Supernatural, 1300-1900'. Davies and University of Hertfordshire colleague Dr Ceri Houlbrook are currently Co-Investigators in 'Bottles Concealed and Revealed', an Arts & Humanities Research Council (AHRC) funded project investigating witch bottles.

Davies has been based at the University of Hertfordshire since the early 2000s. In 2019, he instigated a Folklore Studies MA at the University of Hertfordshire, which is currently the only academic qualification of its kind in England and Wales.

In 2020, Davies was elected President of the Folklore Society.

Selected publications

Davies, Owen and Blécourt, Willem de (editors) (2004). Beyond the witch trials: witchcraft and magic in enlightenment Europe. Manchester: Manchester University Press. . OCLC 186315672.
Davies, Owen and Blécourt, Willem de (editors) (2004). Witchcraft continued: popular magic in modern Europe. Manchester: Manchester University Press. . OCLC 784959128.
 
 
Davies, Owen (2007). The Haunted: A Social History of Ghosts. New York: Palgrave Macmillan. . OCLC 145379850.
Davies, Owen and Barry, Jonathan (editors) (2007) Palgrave advances in witchcraft historiography. Basingstoke [England]: Palgrave Macmillan. 2007. . OCLC 122702023.

Davies, Owen (editor) (2010) Ghosts: A Social History. London: Pickering & Chatto. 2010. . OCLC 501394897.

Davies, Owen (2012). Magic: A Very Short Introduction. Oxford: Oxford University Press. . OCLC 749871159.
Davies, Owen (2013). America Bewitched: The Story of Witchcraft after Salem. Oxford. . OCLC 812686039.
Davies, Owen and Matteoni, Francesca (2017). Executing Magic in the Modern Era: Criminal Bodies and the Gallows in Popular Medicine. Cham: Springer International Publishing. .
Davies, Owen (editor) (2017) The Oxford Illustrated History of Witchcraft and Magic. Oxford, United Kingdom. . OCLC 972537073.
Davies, Owen (2018). A Supernatural War: Magic, Divination and Faith during the First World War. Oxford, United Kingdom. . OCLC 1022082619.

References

External links 

 Research Profile, University of Hertfordshire
 Top 10 Grimoires, selected by Owen Davies for The Guardian.
 The Best Books on Magic recommended by Owen Davies, for Five Books.

Living people
Historians of witchcraft
20th-century Welsh historians
Alumni of Lancaster University
Alumni of Cardiff University
Academics of the University of Hertfordshire
1969 births
Presidents of the Folklore Society
21st-century Welsh historians